Péter Ágoston (born.  Peter Augenstein,  25 March 1874 – 6 September 1925) was a Hungarian politician, jurist, legal scholar, professor and translator who served as Minister of Foreign Affairs in 1919. Before the First World War, he published articles for the Világ, Népszava, Huszadik század and the Szocializmus newspapers. After the Aster Revolution, he was the Chairman of the National Council in Nagyvárad. In Dénes Berinkey's cabinet, he served as state secretary of the interior. During the Hungarian Soviet Republic, he tried to make connections with the Entente Powers as deputy People's Commissar of Foreign Affairs. Gyula Peidl appointed him as People's Commissar, but after few days the Peidl cabinet fell after a coup led by István Friedrich. Ágoston was arrested and sentenced to death. However, he was transferred to the Soviet Union through the occasion of a prisoner exchange. After that, he lived in emigration in (Moscow, London, and finally Paris). He translated works of Engels, Bebel and Mehring into Hungarian under the pseudonym, Pál Rab.

References

 Magyar Életrajzi Lexikon

1874 births
1925 deaths
People from Jimbolia
Foreign ministers of Hungary

Hungarian jurists
Hungarian legal scholars
Hungarian Marxists
Hungarian communists
Hungarian sociologists
Hungarian expatriates in the Soviet Union
Social Democratic Party of Hungary politicians
People granted political asylum in the Soviet Union